Greg Rook (born 1971 in London) is an English painter, known for contemporary figurative paintings capturing the hopes, dreams and successes as well as the disappointments, disillusionment and disasters that radical departures from home life and mainstream society can entail. He studied at Chelsea School of Art 1997–2000 and Goldsmiths College 2000–2002. In 2014 he was shortlisted for the East London Painting Prize. Since 2016 he teaches Fine Art at the London Southbank University.

Solo exhibitions
 2019 - Honyocker, V&A Space, Fabbrica del Vapore, Milan
 2016 - Off-Grid, The Storeroom, London
 2015 - Off-Grid, The Aldridge Gallery, Farnham
 2013 - On the Prospect of Establishing a Pantisocracy, Fred London Ltd
 2012 - Survivors, OMT Gallery, London
 2009 - Clean Skins, Vegas Gallery, London
 2007 - We Live Like This, Lounge Gallery, London
 2005 - Myth II, Gallery Min Min, Tokyo
 2005 - Myth, Gallery Min Min, Tokyo
 2004 - Salvation is a Cowgirl, Adam Street, London
 2004 - The Importance of Disappointment, Electric Palace, Hastings
 2003 - Sirens, Gallery Min Min, Tokyo
 2001 - Greg Rook, Gallery Min Min, Tokyo

Selected group exhibitions
 2015 - Autocatalytic Future Games, No Format, London
 2015 - The Office of Gravitational Documents, Galerie Laurent Mueller, Paris
 2015 - Sunday in the Park with Ed, Display Gallery, London
 2015 - Present Tense, Swindon Museum and Art Gallery, England
 2014 - The Zeitgeist Open 2014, Zeitgeist Arts Projects, London
 2014 - Paint Britain, Ipswich Art School Gallery, Colchester and Ipswich Museums, England
 2014 - Priseman/Seabrook Collection, Huddersfield Art Gallery, England
 2014 - East London Painting Prize, Bow Arts, London
 2013 - The Things of Life, Flowers, London
 2013 - Timeslip, Gallery Stock, Berlin
 2012 - Marmite IV, UK
 2012 - Passage, Blindarte Contemporanea, Naples
 2012 - Augment, Catalyst Arts, Belfast
 2012 - Past and Present, OMT Gallery, London
 2012 - The Perfect Nude, The Charlie Smith Gallery, London
 2011 - The Perfect Nude, Wimbledon Space, London
 2011 - Crash Open, Charlie Dutton Gallery, London
 2011 - Graceland, Trailer, London
 2010 - Crash Open, Charlie Dutton Gallery, London
 2009 - I am by birth a Genovese, Galerie Forde, Geneva
 2009 - These Here United States, Master Piper, London
 2009 - The Royal Republic, Master Piper, London
 2009 - Giddee up!, University of the Arts, London
 2007 - Wintry, Lounge Gallery, London
 2006 - Sensuous Panorama, Lounge Gallery, London
 2006 - Brownfield, Lounge Gallery, London and Mac, Birmingham
 2005 - A Moment in Time, Temple Bar Gallery, Dublin
 2005 - The Lost Night, The Prenelle Gallery, London
 2005 - Current Vision, Sartorial Contemporary Art, London
 2005 - Urban Bodies, 127 Brick Lane, London
 2004 - Caution - Uneven Surfaces, Temporary Contemporary, London
 2004 - SV04, Studio Voltaire, London
 2003 - Godzilla, Trailer, London
 2002 - The Four Colleges, AT Kearney, London
 2000 - Future Map 2000, The London Institute, London
 2000 - Summer Contemporary, Blains Fine Art, London
 1999 - The Last Show on Earth, Clerkenwell, London

Collections
 The Madison Museum of Fine Art, Georgia
 The Swindon Museum and Art Gallery
 The Priseman Seabrook Collection
 The Devereux Collection
 The Lesmes Collection
 The David Roberts Collection
 The University of the Arts Collection

Bibliography
 James Brooks, Greg Rook: We Live Like This, Lounge Gallery, London, 2007.
 Matt Price, Andrea Vento, Joe Gilmore, Michele Robecchi, Greg Rook: Honyocker, Anomie Publishing, London, 2019.

Press
Creegan, Matthew. 5 Things You Need to Know About Greg Rook. The Culture Trip, March 2015.
Mercer, Alison. An Interview with Greg Rook. 2012
Lack, Jessica. Greg Rook: We Live Like This. The Guardian, February 2007.

References

External links
Greg Rook Official Web Site

1971 births
20th-century English painters
English male painters
Artists from London
Living people
Alumni of Goldsmiths, University of London
English contemporary artists
British artists
20th-century English male artists